The School for Lovers is a 1762 comedy play by the British writer William Whitehead.

The original Drury Lane cast included David Garrick as Sir John Dorilant, John Palmer as Modely, William O'Brien as Belmour, Mary Ann Yates as Araminta, Kitty Clive as Lady Beverly and Susannah Maria Cibber as Celia.

References

Bibliography
 Baines, Paul & Ferarro, Julian & Rogers, Pat. The Wiley-Blackwell Encyclopedia of Eighteenth-Century Writers and Writing, 1660-1789. Wiley-Blackwell, 2011.
 Watson, George. The New Cambridge Bibliography of English Literature: Volume 2, 1660-1800. Cambridge University Press, 1971.

1762 plays
Comedy plays
West End plays
Plays by William Whitehead